Sybil Jason (born Sybil Jacobson; 23 November 1927 – 23 August 2011) was an American child film actress who, in the late 1930s, was presented as a rival to Shirley Temple.

Career

Born in Cape Town, South Africa, on 23 November 1927, Sybil Jason began playing the piano at age two and, a year later, began making public appearances doing impersonations of Maurice Chevalier. She was introduced to the theatre-going public of London by way of her uncle, Harry Jacobson, a then-popular London orchestra leader and also pianist for Gracie Fields. The apex of her career came with a concert performance with Frances Day at London's Palace Theatre. Her theatre work led to appearances on radio and phonograph records as well as a supporting role in the film Barnacle Bill (1935).

Irving Asher, the head of Warner Bros.' London studio, saw Jason's performance in Barnacle Bill and arranged for her to make a screen test for the studio. The test was a success, resulting in Warner Bros. signing her to a contract. Her American film debut came as the lead in Little Big Shot (1935), directed by Michael Curtiz and co-starring Glenda Farrell, Robert Armstrong, and Edward Everett Horton.

Jason followed this with supporting roles opposite some of Warner Bros. most popular stars, including Kay Francis in I Found Stella Parish (1935), Al Jolson in The Singing Kid (1936), Pat O'Brien and Humphrey Bogart in The Great O'Malley (1937), and again with Kay Francis in Comet Over Broadway (1938). Warners also starred her in The Captain's Kid (1937), and four Vitaphone two-reelers filmed in Technicolor: Changing of the Guard, A Day at Santa Anita, Little Pioneer, and The Littlest Diplomat.

Jason never became the major rival to Shirley Temple that Warner Bros. had hoped, and her film career ended after playing two supporting roles at 20th-Century Fox. These films — The Little Princess (1939) and The Blue Bird (1940) — supported Temple, who became her lifelong friend.

Personal life
Jason married Anthony Albert Fromlak (aka Anthony Drake) on 30 December 1950. He died in 2005. Their daughter, Toni Maryanna Rossi, is married to Phillip W. Rossi, producer of The New Price Is Right. 
 
Sybil Jason became a naturalized United States citizen in 1952. She died in 2011 and was buried at the Forest Lawn Memorial Park, Hollywood Hills.

Legacy
 Sybil Jason was an active member in the International Al Jolson Society and made frequent appearances at celebrity shows throughout the United States.
 Her autobiography My Fifteen Minutes: An Autobiography of a Child Star of the Golden Era of Hollywood was published in 2004. She also wrote a stage musical, Garage Sale.

Filmography

Bibliography

References

Further reading
 Best, Marc (1971) Those Endearing Young Charms: Child Performers of the Screen, South Brunswick and New York: Barnes & Co, pp. 128–133.

External links
 
 

1927 births
2011 deaths
20th-century American actresses
20th-century South African actresses
American child actresses
20th-century American women singers
20th-century American singers
American film actresses
South African child actresses
South African emigrants to the United States
20th-century South African women singers
South African film actresses
Warner Bros. contract players
Burials at Forest Lawn Memorial Park (Hollywood Hills)
Actresses from Cape Town
21st-century American women